Genoa is a village in Vernon County, Wisconsin, United States. The population was 232 at the 2020 census. The village is within the Town of Genoa.

History
Originally named Bad Axe for the river, the present-day Genoa name came in 1868.

Geography
Genoa is located at  (43.5766383, -91.2242996).

Demographics

2010 census
As of the census of 2010, there were 253 people, 110 households, and 73 families residing in the village. The racial makeup of the village was 97.2% White, 1.6% Native American, 0.4% Asian, and 0.8% from two or more races.

There were 110 households, of which 24.5% had children under the age of 18 living with them, 52.7% were married couples living together, 7.3% had a female householder with no husband present, 6.4% had a male householder with no wife present, and 33.6% were non-families. 29.1% of all households were made up of individuals, and 14.6% had someone living alone who was 65 years of age or older. The average household size was 2.30 and the average family size was 2.79.

The median age in the village was 43.8 years. 23.3% of residents were under the age of 18; 8.6% were between the ages of 18 and 24; 18.6% were from 25 to 44; 26.8% were from 45 to 64; and 22.5% were 65 years of age or older. The gender makeup of the village was 51.8% male and 48.2% female.

2000 census
As of the census of 2000, there were 263 people, 112 households, and 73 families residing in the village. The population density was 872.4 people per square mile (338.5/km2). There were 120 housing units at an average density of 398.1 per square mile (154.4/km2). The racial makeup of the village was 98.10% White, 0.76% Native American, and 1.14% from two or more races. 0.00% of the population were Hispanic or Latino of any race.

There were 112 households, out of which 25.0% had children under the age of 18 living with them, 53.6% were married couples living together, 8.9% had a female householder with no husband present, and 34.8% were non-families. 25.9% of all households were made up of individuals, and 13.4% had someone living alone who was 65 years of age or older. The average household size was 2.35 and the average family size was 2.90.

In the village, the population was spread out, with 23.6% under the age of 18, 5.7% from 18 to 24, 22.1% from 25 to 44, 28.5% from 45 to 64, and 20.2% who were 65 years of age or older. The median age was 44 years. For every 100 females, there were 96.3 males. For every 100 females age 18 and over, there were 87.9 males.

The median income for a household in the village was $32,857, and the median income for a family was $41,667. Males had a median income of $26,250 versus $19,375 for females. The per capita income for the village was $15,384. About 2.6% of families and 6.9% of the population were below the poverty line, including 7.8% of those under the age of eighteen and 2.7% of those 65 or over.

Economy
The La Crosse Boiling Water Reactor is in Genoa. It was shut down in 1987 and decommissioned. The Genoa Generating Station is now located at the site.

Education
The De Soto Area Schools serves Genoa, Wisconsin.

Transportation
Bus service towards La Crosse or Prairie du Chien is provided three times daily per direction by Scenic Mississippi Regional Transit.

References

External links

 Genoa, Wisconsin village website 
 Genoa National Fish Hatchery
 Sanborn fire insurance map: 1894

Villages in Vernon County, Wisconsin
Villages in Wisconsin
Wisconsin populated places on the Mississippi River